{{Infobox concert
| concert_tour_name = El Último Tour Del Mundo 2022
| image = BadBunnyTour2022Poster.jpg
| image_size = 220px
| border = yes
| artist = Bad Bunny
| album = YHLQMDLG El Último Tour Del Mundo
| prev_year = 2020| start_date = 
| end_date = 
| number_of_legs = 1
| number_of_shows = 35
| attendance = 575,000
| gross = $117 million
| last_tour = X 100Pre Tour(2019)
| this_tour = El Último Tour Del Mundo(2022)
| next_tour = World's Hottest Tour(2022)
}}

El Último Tour Del Mundo 2022 was the third concert tour by Bad Bunny, in support of his second and third studio albums YHLQMDLG and El Último Tour Del Mundo, both released in 2020. The tour started on February 9, 2022 in Denver and ended in Miami on April 3, 2022. It had one leg in the United States and 35 shows in total. The tour was a box office success with all the dates sold out. It grossed a total of $117 million with a total attendance over 575,000 fans, making it the highest grossing tour by a Latin artist in Billboard Boxscore history. Also, it was the fastest selling tour since 2018. On average, Bad Bunny's tour has had a per-show ticket count of 15,990 and a gross of $3.2 million.

 Background 
Bad Bunny had originally planned to tour the world in 2020 in support of his second studio album YHLQMDLG. A massive European leg was scheduled to happen in the summer, with Martinez headlining A-list festivals such as Primavera Sound. However, due to the COVID-19 pandemic, most dates were pushed back to 2021 and later to 2022. On April 11, 2021, a brand new North American arena tour of Bad Bunny was announced during WrestleMania 37.

 Critical reception 
Emmalyse Brownstein from Miami Times attended to the concert on the FTX Arena and gave a positive review titled "Bad Bunny Held the Crowd in the Palm of His Hand During El Último Tour del Mundo at FTX Arena". Consequent Sound praised the first show of the tour and stated on their review: "The energy stepping inside the arena was palpable, and proud'' — an earnest reflection of the many attendees’ thoughts on seeing the boy who came from humble beginnings in Puerto Rico now selling out arenas".

Set list 
The following set list is representative of the show on March 29 , 2022 in Amway Center. It is not representative of all concerts for the duration of the tour.

Shows

References 

Bad Bunny concert tours
2022 concert tours
Concert tours of Canada
Concert tours of the United States